The Cat Who Played Post Office is the sixth book in The Cat Who series, published in 1987.  Jim Qwilleran has acquired a large mansion, from Aunt Fanny, and of course a mystery.  Iris Cobb joins him in Pickax as the mansion's caretaker, along with Koko and Yum Yum.  Koko keeps trying to tell Qwill something about the missing housemaid, Daisy Mull.

1987 novels
Played Post Office
Novels about cats